"Better Man" is a song by Irish pop vocal band Westlife. It was released on by Virgin EMI Records on 29 March 2019 as the second single from the band's eleventh studio album, Spectrum. It is their second single released under Universal Music Group and Virgin EMI Records. The song was written by Ed Sheeran, Fred Gibson, Steve Mac and Wayne Hector. This is the most successful and highest-charting song and single co-written by Gibson for a pop and male band. As of 30 November 2021, this is their twentieth biggest single of all time in the United Kingdom.

This is their second number-one hit in the UK Singles Physical Chart and number-two in UK Singles Sales Chart and Scottish Singles Chart in 2019 and in 2010s decade. The single is their 29th Top 10 hit in Ireland and 28th Top 40, and 29th Top 75 hit in the United Kingdom.

Background, development, and release
Since they announced their breakup in 2011 and their last appearance together in 2012, several rumors about them reuniting and making new musics have appeared. On 23 September 2018, several Irish news outlets started reporting that the group has been signed to Universal Music Group and Virgin EMI Records for a new music record deal. On 3 October 2018, the group announced that there would be new music coming soon.

This song is set in the key of B major, in a moderate 4/4 time signature. The vocal range of this piece ranges from F#3 to B4 (Feehily's harmony).

Music video
The music video was directed by Lochlainn "Locky" McKenna and was filmed in Dublin, Ireland in two locations. The band were shot in the historic Windmill Lane Studios. The music video depicts a teenage romance blossoming in 1993, and they become estranged after the boy ignores her after a school performance, but they soon get back together. That same girl is shown in the recording studio where the band is singing the song, all grown up. And she is married to that same boy, and they have a kid together.

Tours performed at
The Twenty Tour (2019)

Formats and track listings
Digital download
"Better Man" – 3:17

Digital download
"Better Man"  – 3:23

CD single / streaming
"Better Man" – 3:17
"Better Man"  – 3:23

Digital download / streaming
"Better Man"  – 3:13

Credits and personnel
 Westlife (Kian Egan, Mark Feehily, Nicky Byrne, Shane Filan) – vocals, associated performer
 Ed Sheeran – songwriting
 Steve Mac – production, songwriting, keyboards, piano
 Fred Gibson – songwriting
 Wayne Hector – songwriting
 Chris Laws – drums, engineering,  mixing
 Dann Pursey – engineering
 John Parricelli – guitar
 Dave Arch – strings, arranger
 Steve Pearce – bass
 Dick Beetham – mastering
 Duncan Fuller – engineering
 Mike Horner - engineering

Charts

Certifications

Release history

References

Westlife songs
2019 singles
2019 songs
Virgin EMI Records singles
Universal Music Group singles
Song recordings produced by Steve Mac
Songs written by Steve Mac
Songs written by Ed Sheeran
Songs written by Wayne Hector
Pop ballads
Songs written by Fred Again